Cachalot Peak is a peak,  high, between Stubb Glacier and Starbuck Glacier in southeastern Aristotle Mountains, about  west of Mount Queequeg, near the east coast of Graham Land. The toponym is one in a group by the UK Antarctic Place-Names Committee that reflects a whaling theme, "cachalot" being the sperm whale.

References 

Mountains of Graham Land
Oscar II Coast